Alfta-Ösa OK is a Swedish sport club from Alfta, specialising in orienteering and ski orienteering. It was established in 1980 by merging Alfta SOK and ÖSA OK. 

Alfta-Ösa OK won the Venla relay in 2017 with a team consisting of Galina Vinogradova, Josefine Heikka, Sara Eskilsson and Natalia Gemperle.

Sources 

Orienteering clubs in Sweden
Hälsingland